Kent was an electoral riding in southwestern Ontario, Canada. It was created in 1867 at the time of confederation. It was abolished in 1875 when it was split into  Kent East and Kent West ridings. It was re-established in 1967 and then redistributed into Kent-Elgin in 1975. It was finally abolished in 1987 when it was merged into Essex—Kent.

Members of Provincial Parliament

References

Former provincial electoral districts of Ontario